Pristiterebra is a genus of sea snails, marine gastropod mollusks in the family Terebridae, the auger snails.

Nomenclature
The name Pristiterebra is not available (no description, no type species designation) from Taki & Oyama, 1954 (Palaeontological Society of Japan, Special Papers 2: 28). It was given precedence over the simultaneously published Laeviacus by First Reviser's choice by Terryn & Holford, 2009, Visaya, suppl. 3; 46.

Species
Species within the genus Pristiterebra include:
 Pristiterebra bifrons (Hinds, 1844)
 Pristiterebra frausseni Poppe, Tagaro & Terryn, 2009
 Pristiterebra miranda (E.A. Smith, 1873)
 Pristiterebra pustulosa (E.A. Smith, 1879)
 † Pristiterebra tsuboiana (Yokoyama, 1922) 
 Pristiterebra tuberculosa (Hinds, 1844)
Species brought into synonymy
 Pristiterebra glauca (Hinds, 1844): synonym of Neoterebra glauca (Hinds, 1844)
 Pristiterebra macleani (Bratcher, 1988): synonym of Partecosta macleani (Bratcher, 1988)
 Pristiterebra milelinae (Aubry, 1999): synonym of Terebra bellanodosa Grabau & S. G. King, 1928
 Pristiterebra petiveriana (Deshayes, 1857): synonym of Neoterebra petiveriana (Deshayes, 1857)

References

 Oyama K. (1961). On some new facts of the taxonomy of Terebridae. Venus. 21(2): 176-189
 Terryn Y. (2007). Terebridae: A Collectors Guide. Conchbooks & NaturalArt. 59pp + plates

External links
 Fedosov, A. E.; Malcolm, G.; Terryn, Y.; Gorson, J.; Modica, M. V.; Holford, M.; Puillandre, N. (2020). Phylogenetic classification of the family Terebridae (Neogastropoda: Conoidea). Journal of Molluscan Studies

Terebridae